Mammoth is a census-designated place located in Mount Pleasant Township, Westmoreland County in the state of Pennsylvania, United States, with its own post office and postal zip code: 15664. The community is located just off Pennsylvania Route 982.  As of the 2010 census,  the population was 525 residents. It is part of the Mount Pleasant Area School District.

Demographics

Local Attractions 
Mammoth is home to Mammoth Park, a 408-acre park that features a stocked freshwater lake, recreational areas, several playgrounds, and pavilions. The park was formerly home to the Giant Slide, a favorite destination for locals. In the spring, the annual Mammoth Fest festival featuring vendor booths and children's rides is held at the park.

Also located in Mammoth is the Mount Pleasant Township Municipal Building.

Despite its small population, Mammoth is home to several businesses, including Citizens Telephone Company of Kecksburg which first opened in 1906 to bring telephone services to the rural miners and farmers who lived in the area. The business was later rebranded as Citizens Fiber in 2015 and is still in operation.

Mammoth is situated in close proximity to the site of the 1965 Kecksburg UFO incident in which many local residents claimed to have witnessed an object streak across the sky and crash-land in the woods of neighboring Kecksburg, PA. The government response to the incident has led many to speculate what the object was, leading to many theories such as a UFO or Russian satellite.

Mining 
Known as the infamous Mammoth Mine Disaster, on January 27, 1891, an explosion tore through Mammoth No. 1 Mine owned at the time by H.C. Frick Coke Company. Newspapers reported that firedamp was ignited by a miner's oil lamp, causing the explosion. All 110 miners who entered that day were killed instantly. 

The workers killed in the mine explosion were buried in a mass grave in St. John's Cemetery in Scottdale, Pennsylvania. In 2000, the Pennsylvania Historical and Museum Commission erected a historical marker at the burial site commemorating the Mammoth Mine Explosion. 

The sealed-off entrance to the mine can still be seen today. It is situated behind the Mount Pleasant Township Municipal Building, which once served as the former boiler house and lamp house for the mine. It is the only building from the mining operation still in existence. Many of the patch homes once owned by the miners and their families are still occupied today throughout Mammoth and along Poker Road.

References

External links

Census-designated places in Westmoreland County, Pennsylvania
Historic American Engineering Record in Pennsylvania
Census-designated places in Pennsylvania